

In Ancient Greek

Tamil loanwords in Ancient Greek came about due to the interactions of Mediterranean and South Indian merchants. Tamil loanwords entered the Greek language throughout different periods in history. Most words had to do with items of trade that were unique to South India. Although there is general consensus that there are Tamil loanwords in Ancient Greek, few of the words have competing etymologies as well.

In Biblical Hebrew

The importance of Tamil loanwords in Biblical Hebrew is that linguistically these words are the earliest attestation of the Tamil language. These words were incorporated into the writing of the Hebrew Bible starting before 500 BCE. Although a number of authors have identified many Biblical and post-Biblical words of Tamil, Old Tamil, or Dravidian origin, a number of them have competing etymologies and some Tamil derivations are considered controversial.

In English

In Malay
Loanwords from Tamil, mainly exist in cuisine, like Chinese and unlike Sanskrit. It mainly entered the lexicon of Classical Malay (and by extension, its Modern and Indonesian variants) with the immigration of South Indian traders who settled around the Strait of Malacca. See also Wiktionary:Appendix:Malay words of Tamil origin.

In Mauritian Creole

In Tagalog
Close contact through commercial networks between India and Maritime Southeast Asia for more than two millennia, bolstered by the establishment of Tamil as a literary language in India starting from the 9th century, allowed the spread of Dravidian loanwords in several local languages of Southeast Asia, including Old Malay and Tagalog. A list of Tagalog words with Tamil origins are shown below.

In Indonesian

Loanwords from Tamil, while also an Indian language (though not Indo-European like Sanskrit), mainly exist in cuisine, like Chinese and unlike Sanskrit. It is a Dravidian language and not an Indo-Aryan language. However, Hinduism had great impact in Tamil, there are several Indo-Aryan loanwords in Tamil and they are possibility to list them in Indo-Aryan loanwords, such as Sanskrit.

Interaction between Tamil speakers and Malay speakers has been established from ancient time. Tamil influence has been around such as Palava usage as ancient script in Indonesia (Palava dynasty was existed on 275 CE–897 CE) and Chola invasion of Srivijaya in 1025. It mainly entered the lexicon of Malay (and by extension, Indonesian) with the immigration of South Indian traders who settled around the Strait of Malacca.

In Russian

In Sinhala

Sinhala words of Tamil origin came about as part of the more than 2,000 years of language interactions between Sinhala and Tamil in the island of Sri Lanka, as well as through Dravidian substratum effect on the Sinhala Language.

In Sinhala words

In the following list, Tamil words are romanised in accordance with Tamil spelling. This results in seeming discrepancies in voicing between Sinhala words and their Tamil counterparts. Sinhala borrowing, however, has taken place on the basis of the sound of the Tamil words; thus, the word ampalam, [ambalam], logically results in the Sinhala spelling ambalama, and so forth. However, the Tamil language used here for comparison is Tamil as spoken in Sri Lanka.

In Sinhala verbs

Several verbs have been adopted into Sinhala from the Tamil language. The vast majority of these are compound verbs consisting of a Tamil origin primary verb and a Sinhala origin light verb.

See also

Wiktionary:Appendix:Malay words of Tamil origin
List of countries and territories where Tamil is an official language
Tamil population by cities
Tamil population per nation
Tamil language
Tamil people
Tamilisation

References

Lists of loanwords
Tamil language